Bwlch Mawr is a hill near the northeastern corner of the Llŷn Peninsula in the community of Clynnog in the county of Gwynedd in North Wales.

Its name is an odd one for a hill, as it means "big pass" in English. It forms the eastern half of a wider upland area, the highest point of which is the 522 m summit of Gyrn Ddu, though it is Bwlch Mawr on which the Ordnance Survey constructed a trig point.

Geology 
In common with a number of other isolated hills in Llŷn, Bwlch Mawr is formed by an igneous intrusion of Palaeozoic age.

Access 
A single public footpath crosses the southern flanks of the hill but the upper parts of Bwlch Mawr are designated as open country under the Countryside and Rights of Way Act 2000 and therefore freely available to walkers. In the northwest a bridleway runs south from the village of Clynnog-fawr to the edge of open country.

References

External links 
 43084287 images of Bwlch Mawr and area on Geograph website

Mountains and hills of Gwynedd